Resavica may refer to:

 Resavica River (Resava), a river in Serbia, tributary to the Resava River
 Resavica River (Morava), or Resavčina, river in Serbia, tributary to the Velika Morava
 Resavica (town), a town in Serbia
 Resavica (village), a village in Serbia
 Resavica (coal mine), a coal mine in Serbia